The Joint Economic Committee (JEC) is one of four standing joint committees of the U.S. Congress.  The committee was established as a part of the Employment Act of 1946, which deemed the committee responsible for reporting the current economic condition of the United States and for making suggestions for improvement to the economy. The JEC is currently chaired by Representative Don Beyer of Virginia.

Jurisdiction
Study the implications of the Economic Report of the President
Seek ways to coordinate programs involved in the Report
File an annual report relating to its study of these implications and programs with the Senate, the House of Representatives, and all Congressional committees having legislative duties relating to the Report
Make other reports and recommendations to the Senate and the House as the committee members see fit
Hold hearings on the report and other economic matters as the committee members see fit.

Members, 117th Congress

Source

Historical committee rosters

116th Congress

Source

115th Congress

Source

References

External links
Majority Office of the Joint Economic Committee
Minority Office of the Joint Economic Committee

Economic Joint Committee
Economy of the United States
1946 establishments in Washington, D.C.
Government agencies established in 1946